Buckeye was an unincorporated community in Yolo County, California, United States.

History
Buckeye was named for the native Buckeye (Aesculus californica) trees growing along Buckeye Creek. The town was in existence before April 11, 1855, when a church was then built in it. Reverend JN Pendegast, the pastor of the church in nearby Woodland, reported the news in 1858 that a church had indeed been built in Buckeye. 

The local post office was established on May 17, 1855, and named after the town. JO Maxwell was the postmaster between 1857-1860 and transferred the post office to his store named Buckeye Store which he built in 1857.

In 1870 the area had a Masonic Hall, saloon, hotel, two stores, blacksmith, shoemaker's shop, boarding house, and the Buckeye School, which was located on County Roads 31 and 90A. It also still had a post office.

The railroad tracks reached the  new townsite of Winters in 1875, when the town was established. Buckeye residents subsequently moved to the new towns of Winters and Madison, and the post office was closed. They even divided the church's building materials between the two cities they were migrating to. In 1879 the only thing left of the town was the school they had built and two farmers who had stayed behind.

References 

Ghost towns in California
Former settlements in Yolo County, California
1879 disestablishments in California